Trilogy Systems Corporation was a computer systems company started in 1980. Originally called ACSYS, the company was founded by Gene Amdahl, his son Carl Amdahl and Clifford Madden. Flush with the success of his previous company, Amdahl Corporation, Gene Amdahl was able to raise $230 million for his new venture.  Trilogy was the most well funded start-up company up till that point in Silicon Valley history. It had corporate support from Groupe Bull, Digital Equipment Corporation, Unisys, Sperry Rand and others. The plan was to use extremely advanced semiconductor manufacturing techniques to build an IBM compatible mainframe computer that was both cheaper and more powerful than existing systems from IBM and Amdahl Corporation.

These techniques included wafer scale integration (WSI), with the goal of producing a computer chip that was 2.5 inch on one side. At the time, computer chips of only 0.25 inch on a side could be reliably manufactured. This giant chip was to be connected to the rest of the system using a package with 1200 pins, an enormous number at the time. Previously, mainframe computers were built from hundreds of computer chips due to the size of standard computer chips. These computer systems were hampered through chip-to-chip communication which both slowed performance as well consumed much power.

As with other WSI projects, Trilogy's chip design relied on redundancy, that is replication of functional units, to overcome the manufacturing defects that precluded such large chips. If one functional unit was not fabricated properly, it would be switched out through on-chip wiring and another correctly functioning copy would be used. By keeping most communication on-chip, the dual benefits of higher performance and lower power consumption were supposed to be achieved. Lower power consumption meant less expensive cooling systems, which would aid in lower system costs.

For maximum performance, bipolar emitter-coupled logic was employed, even though its power consumption is large.

The large chip size demanded larger minimum dimensions for the transistors (due to photolithography manufacturing tolerances over the large chip) than standard-size chips. Consequently, logic density and performance were less than had been forecast.

"Triple Modular Redundancy" was employed systematically. Every logic gate and every flip-flop were triplicated with binary two-out-of-three voting at each flip-flop.

Alongside the advances in chip manufacturing, advanced chip packaging techniques were also pursued by the company. These included vertical stacking of computer chips and chip-to-chip interconnect technology that used copper conductors and polyimide insulation that allowed for extremely dense packing of signal wiring. Though overall system power consumption would be lower, the power dissipation would be much more concentrated at the single large chip. This required new cooling techniques such as sealed heat exchangers to be developed.

The company was beset by many problems. Gene Amdahl was involved in a car accident and preoccupied with the ensuing lawsuit. Madden, the company's president, died from a brain tumor. Their semiconductor fabrication plant was damaged during construction by a winter storm. The redundancy schemes used in the design were not sufficient to give reasonable manufacturing yields. The chip interconnect technology could not be reliably manufactured as the layers tended to delaminate and there was no automated way to repair soldering errors.

In 1983, the company had an initial public offering and raised $60 million.

By mid-1984, the company decided it was too difficult to manufacture their computer design. Gene Amdahl stepped down as CEO and Henry Montgomery was brought in as replacement.

The new leadership redirected the company to be a technology provider to other computer companies. The only major customer was Digital Equipment, which paid $10 million for the rights to the interconnect and cooling technologies. These were used for its VAX 9000 mainframe computers. Years later, the manufacturing difficulties of the copper/polyimide technology restricted DEC's ability to ship its mainframes.

At the end of 1985, Gene Amdahl, as company chairman, decided to stop all Trilogy development and use the remaining $70 million of the raised capital to buy Elxsi, a minicomputer start-up company. In 1989, Gene Amdahl left the merged company.

Trilogy systems was known as one of the largest financial failures in Silicon Valley before the burst of Internet/dotcom bubble in 2001. In describing the company, financial columnists coined the term "crater" as describing companies that consumed huge amounts of venture capital and later imploded to leave nothing for its investors.

References

  Myron Magnet, GENE AMDAHL FIGHTS TO SALVAGE A WRECK / Fortune Magazine article on Trilogy's history, September 1, 1986

American companies established in 1980
American companies disestablished in 1985
Computer companies established in 1980
Computer companies disestablished in 1985
Defunct computer companies of the United States